Astroblepus mancoi is a species of catfish of the family Astroblepidae. It can be found on the Ucayali River on Peru.

Named in honor of Inca governor and founder Ayar Manco, also known as Manco Cápac, “the Moses of the Peruvians, who led the exodus from Tampu-tocco to Cuzco about 1100 A.D.”

References

Bibliography
Eschmeyer, William N., ed. 1998. Catalog of Fishes. Special Publication of the Center for Biodiversity Research and Information, num. 1, vol. 1–3. California Academy of Sciences. San Francisco, California, United States. 2905. .

Astroblepus
Fish described in 1928
Taxa named by Carl H. Eigenmann
Freshwater fish of Peru